Abdul Aziz (born 15 April 1935) is a Pakistani wrestler. He competed in the men's freestyle flyweight at the 1956 Summer Olympics.

References

1935 births
Living people
Pakistani male sport wrestlers
Olympic wrestlers of Pakistan
Wrestlers at the 1956 Summer Olympics
Place of birth missing (living people)